Events in the year 2018 in the Dominican Republic.

Incumbents
 President: Danilo Medina
 Vice President: Margarita Cedeño de Fernández

Events

Deaths

31 May – , merengue singer (b. 1920).

17 July – Bullumba Landestoy, pianist and composer (b. 1925).

4 November – José Rafael Abinader, politician, lawyer and writer (b. 1929).

References

 
Years of the 21st century in the Dominican Republic
Dominican Republic
Dominican Republic